It's My Life is the second studio album by English band Talk Talk, released in 1984.

Recording 

Mike Oldfield's bass player, Phil Spalding made an uncredited appearance on the album, substituting for Paul Webb on "The Last Time" – "Paul was exclusively a fretless bass player and they needed a fretted bass on this particular track." Spalding admits to having played the whole session while disastrously hung-over, and that – foreshadowing the approach Talk Talk would take on subsequent recordings - Tim Friese-Greene and Mark Hollis insisted that he record a whole afternoon and evening of multiple takes, despite the simplicity of the part. Ian Curnow adds "we always had to go all around the houses to get next door, just in case there was anything that turned up on the other side."

Cover

The cover to the album was produced by James Marsh, incorporating elements of The Boyhood of Raleigh by John Everett Millais.

Release 

It's My Life was released in February 1984 by record label EMI.

It's My Life was a top 5 hit album in several European countries, thanks to the big international success of its singles (notably "Such a Shame"), and was particularly successful in Switzerland, the Netherlands and Germany where the album peak-charted at numbers 2, 3 and 4, respectively. In the Netherlands, the album stayed in the charts for 64 weeks between 1984 and 1986. It also reached number 35 in the UK albums chart. In the United States, the album just missed the top 40, reaching number 42.

In 2000 it was voted number 872 in Colin Larkin's All Time Top 1000 Albums.

In 2021, Rhino Entertainment re-released the album on limited edition purple vinyl.

Track listing

Personnel
Talk Talk
Mark Hollis – lead vocals and  backing vocals, acoustic guitar
Paul Webb – fretless bass (except on "The Last Time"), backing vocals
Lee Harris – electronic drums
Additional personnel
Tim Friese-Greene – synthesizers, piano, programming and drum machine
Ian Curnow – keyboards
Phil Ramocon – piano
Robbie McIntosh – guitars
Morris Pert – percussion
Henry Lowther – trumpet on "Renée" and "Tomorrow Started" 
Phil Spalding (uncredited) – bass guitar on "The Last Time"

Charts

Weekly charts

Year-end charts

Certifications

References 

1984 albums
Talk Talk albums
EMI Records albums